Marta Carcana is a retired United States Army officer. The former Adjutant General of the Puerto Rico National Guard, she served during the administration of Governor Alejandro Garcia Padilla from 2015 to 2017 and was the first woman to hold the position.

Early life and education
Carcana was born in Bayamón, Puerto Rico. She graduated from Eastern District High School in Brooklyn, New York. She has an associate degree in nursing from New York City College of Technology and a bachelor's degree from the Metropolitan University of Puerto Rico and a master's degree in business administration from the University Central of Michigan in Puerto Rico. General Carcana received her direct commission as second lieutenant in 1986. She has an MS in Strategic Studies from the United States Army War College.

Career
Carcana began her broad and extensive military career in the 1986 in United States Army Reserve serving as a clinical nurse with the MC HSP FLD (HUB), at Capt. Eurípides Rubio United States Army Reserve Center in Puerto Nuevo, Puerto Rico. Entered the Puerto Rico National Guard in 1996, served as RSS Chief, 101st Troop Command FWD, San Juan, Puerto Rico, Pristina Kosovo, Military Assistant to Chief of Staff and military missions as a nurse. In October 2014, Carcana was appointed Acting-Adjutant General of the Puerto Rico National Guard, after the resignation of Brigadier General Juan José Medina Lamela.

Jan 2017 - Mar 2017 Director, Joint Staff - (PR) Joint Force Headquarters (JFHQ), Joint Force Headquarters, San Juan, Puerto Rico 
Jul 2015 - Jan 2017 The Adjutant General, Puerto Rico, San Juan, Puerto Rico 
Mar 2013 - Jun 2015 Director, Joint Staff - (PR) Joint Force Headquarters (JFHQ), San Juan, Puerto Rico
Jan 2013 - Feb 13 Chief of Joint Staff, PRARNG Element JFHQ, San Juan, Puerto Rico 
Apr 2011 - Dec 12 Deputy Commander of CL, PRARNG Element JFHQ, San Juan, Puerto Rico 
Apr 2010 - Mar 11 RSS Chief, 101st Troop Command FWD, San Juan, Puerto Rico, Pristina Kosovo, Military Assistant to Chief of Staff 
Oct 2009 - Mar 10 Deputy Commander of CL, PRARNG Medical Command, Salinas, Puerto Rico 
Jan 2009 - Sep 09 Chief-Case Management, PRARNG Medical Command, Salinas, Puerto Rico 
Oct 2007 - Dec 08 Deputy Commander of CL, PRARNG Medical Command, Salinas, Puerto Rico 
Dec 2005 - Sep 07 Deputy Commander-Chief Nurse, PRARNG Medical Command, Salinas, Puerto Rico 
Feb 2003 - Nov 05 Executive Officer, PRARNG Medical Command, Salinas, Puerto Rico 
Dec 2001 - Jan 03 Head Nurse, PRARNG Medical Command, Salinas, Puerto Rico 
Aug 2001 - Nov 01 Clinical Nurse, PRARNG Element JFHQ, San Juan, Puerto Rico 
Oct 1998 - Jul 01 Clinical Nurse, HQ STARC, Medical Detachment, Salinas, Puerto Rico 
Jul 1996 - Sep 98 Clinical Nurse, 201st EVAC Hospital, Salinas, Puerto Rico 
Feb 1995 - Jun 96 Clinical Nurse, USAR MEDDAC Womack Army Medical Center, Fort Bragg, North Carolina 
Feb 1986 - Jan 95 Clinical Nurse, USAR MC HSP FLD (HUB), Puerto Nuevo, Puerto Rico

Military awards and decorations
Over the year, Carcana has received multiple awards and decorations including:

Effective dates of promotions

See also

List of Puerto Ricans
List of Puerto Rican military personnel
Puerto Rico Adjutant General
History of women in Puerto Rico

References

1958 births
Female generals of the United States Army
United States Army personnel of the Kosovo War
United States Army generals
National Guard (United States) generals
People from Bayamón, Puerto Rico
Puerto Rico Adjutant Generals
Puerto Rican Army personnel
Puerto Rican military officers
Puerto Rican nurses
Puerto Rican women in the military
United States Army reservists
United States Army War College alumni
Living people
Puerto Rico National Guard personnel
Recipients of the Meritorious Service Medal (United States)
Eastern District High School alumni
20th-century American women